Burnaby North Secondary School is a secondary school in Burnaby, British Columbia, Canada. It encompasses two buildings at 751 Hammarskjold Drive in Burnaby. Nearly 1,800 students from grades 8 to 12 attend the school. A statue of a Viking head, the mascot of the school's sports teams, stands in front of the two buildings. Burnaby North Secondary School is nestled in Kensington Park, providing room for the school's ice rink, 18 hole pitch and putt golfing centre, outdoor swimming pool, 3 tennis courts, 4 baseball diamonds, softball diamond, an artificial turf field, 6 lane 400 metre concrete track and field tracks, and 2 outdoor natural grass fields. It is the largest school by population and school area in the school district of Burnaby School District 41.

History
Burnaby North was established in 1922 with around 50 students. In 1982, Kensington Junior Secondary School (Crusaders) and Burnaby North Senior Secondary School (Vikings) were merged as one.

The project to merge "Kensington Jr" and "Burnaby North Sr" into "Burnaby North Secondary" began in the 1981/1982 school year. The objective was to see if money could be saved by sharing the resources and staff between the two schools. The former Kensington was referred as the "South Building" and Burnaby North Sr. was referred to as the "North Building". A wheelchair access elevator was added in 1983 to the North Building's east entrance.

To accommodate the merged schools, two connections were built. A level sheltered walkway was constructed to connect the ground-level south-facing entrance of the North building to the second floor of the southwestern entrance of the South building, and a wooden staircase was built on a hill to provide access from the North building's east entrance to the South building's ground-level north entrance. The latter was replaced by a sheltered walkway that had a more gradual slope to accommodate accessibility.

In 2010, the school was named Canada's Greenest School.

In, 2017 the British Columbia Ministry of Education announced the school would undergo a program to seismically mitigate and upgrade all buildings (under the British Columbia Ministry of Education Seismic Mitigation Program). On 12 October 2018, the British Columbia Ministry of Education officially announced funding for a complete rebuild of the current campus totaling CA$79.2 million. Construction is slated to be complete for September 2021, to coincide with the 100th anniversary of Burnaby North Secondary School.

On 4 October 2019, controversy erupted at Burnaby North when news articles and reports surfaced of an incident involving the 2019–20 Hong Kong protests. A student allegedly placed a "Free Hong Kong" poster with the Chinese Characters for "Hong Kong Democracy" on their school locker. The poster was ripped down multiple times by a number of unknown students. Subsequently, a male student pushed the fellow female student in a "shoving incident" This resulted in a confrontation "more physical than we would like to see", said Principal David Rawnsley. Eventually, school staff broke up the incident, which had occurred in the Social Studies/History wing, and all students and their parents were notified of the incident.

Academics
Burnaby North is a highly academic school which enrolls a population of over 2000 students in grades 8 through grade 12. The student body is composed of students from many ethnic backgrounds, although most of the students are of East-Asian descent. The graduating class consists of approximately 450 to 500 students on average, many of whom are offered scholarships to attend well-known universities. Ivy League admission rates are very high in comparison to other Canadian public high schools; Burnaby North alumni have attended institutions such as Harvard University, Yale University, Princeton University and the University of Pennsylvania. In recent years, Burnaby North graduates have won more than a million dollars in scholarship money annually.

In 2010, the eight high schools in the district earned almost $7.3 million in scholarship money. Burnaby North came in second place in the district, earning $1.2 million, $1.16 million of which came externally.

Burnaby North has one of the largest Advanced Placement (AP) programs in Canada. Over 30% of the student body is enrolled in at least one Honours or AP course. In May 2007, 297 students wrote a total of 687 exams in 17 subject areas and a score of 3 or higher was earned on 86% of those exams, and 104 students achieved AP Scholar status, indicating they had scored 3 out of a possible 5 on at least 3 AP exams. This indicates quite early that the program is not only large, but is also of high quality. In 2007, a total of 31 students achieved National AP Scholar status, the highest standing which requires an average score of 4 over five or more exams, surpassing the previous year's record of 18 and setting a national record. In 2008, a total of 97 students became AP Scholars, and 35 students achieved National AP Scholar status, again surpassing the previous year's record and setting a national record. In 2009, there were 86 AP Scholars and 23 National AP Scholars.

In October 2013, Burnaby North announced that it will be offering the Advanced Placement (AP) Capstone Diploma starting in the 2014–15 school year. The AP Capstone program is a pilot program that is currently offered in a handful of schools worldwide.

Burnaby North also offers a very well established Career Preparation program whereby students go out on work experience for between 30 and 90 hours. The goal is to introduce students to the world of work and to enable students to explore a career area that is of interest to them. Burnaby North is at the leading edge of the latest industry training programs (ACE-IT) that enable students to complete the first year theory exams and a portion of the on-the-job training requirements of an apprenticeship program.

Athletics
Burnaby North currently offers a Hockey Academy, a Soccer Academy, and a Basketball Academy program. Several NHL players have attended this school, most notably Joe Sakic, Cliff Ronning, Mike Santorelli, and Ryan Nugent-Hopkins.

The school has a competitive volleyball team, having won several provincial titles, and a competitive swimming team, which have won multiple district titles and often places high at the provincial level. The school has very talented soccer teams as well, boys and girls. Burnaby North is also well known for their table tennis team, which have won numerous provincial titles.

Burnaby North also had a competitive cheerleading team which performs at school events and competitions, including the Sea to Sky International Cheerleading Championships. This competition is the second largest in North America.

School Band
While Burnaby North is considered a highly academic school, its music program is also renowned. In the summer of 2015, the band director, Peter Wenzek who ran the concert bands, the orchestra, and the marching band, left Burnaby North to teach elementary students. The jazz bands, concert bands, marching band, and orchestra are taught by Ms. Alley Steiger. Its concert and jazz band programs are the largest in Western Canada, and are often invited to national music festivals, such as the Kiwanis Music Festival. The school's marching band, well known for their maroon uniforms and Viking headwear, are often invited to participate in the Calgary Stampede and other national events.  New uniforms for the marching band were introduced in June 2012 during the annual Hats Off Day Parade. It won gold in the large ensemble and orchestra classes of the 2015 Vancouver Kiwanis Music Festival.

Viking Head
Burnaby North's Viking Head statue was installed in 1994. The enormous black head wearing a two-horned helmet and facing Union Street was built by the school's Technology Education wing's welding staff and students. Traditionally, it gets decorated with a Santa hat every Christmas season, and bunny ears during Easter. During the 2010 Winter Olympics in Vancouver, it was covered with a red and white tuque and scarf, the national colours of Canada.

Filming
Burnaby North was used for the public service announcement-style commercial of Metroid Prime 2: Echoes that was shown in North America.
The movie Hot Rod also had scenes filmed at the outside stairway location.

Notable alumni and staff

Alumni
Joe Sakic – retired hockey player 
Dave Nonis – former GM of the Vancouver Canucks and Toronto Maple leafs.
Don Mattrick – former CEO of Zynga, former president of the Interactive Entertainment Business at Microsoft, and former president of Worldwide Studios for Electronic Arts 
Vince Murdocco – actor 
Cliff Ronning – retired hockey player 
Joe Keithley – musician, Burnaby city councillor
Svend Robinson – politician 
Tamara Taggart – TV personality
Jade Kwan – musician 
Mike Santorelli – hockey player, plays for the Anaheim Ducks
Ryan Nugent-Hopkins – hockey player, plays for the Edmonton Oilers 
Wayne Wong – member of the Canadian Ski Hall of Fame and U.S. Ski Hall of Fame 
Diana Bang – actress and writer, portrayed Sook Yin Park in The Interview
Andrea Bang - actress and writer, plays Janet Kim in Kim's Convenience
Antonio Cupo - actor, plays Marco Moretti in Bomb Girls
Jack McIlhargey - Played for: Philadelphia Flyers, Vancouver Canucks, Hartford Whalers

Staff
Manuel Sobral – boxer
Barry Seebaran – retired Canadian cricket player

References

External links
Burnaby North Secondary School
Burnaby North Secondary School Marching Band 

High schools in Burnaby
High schools in British Columbia
Educational institutions established in 1922
1922 establishments in British Columbia